The 1907–08 Scottish Cup was the 35th season of Scotland's most prestigious football knockout competition. The Cup was won by Celtic when they beat St Mirren 5–1.

Calendar

First round

Replays

Second Replay

Match played at Cathkin Park

Second round

Replays

Second Replay

Match played at Hampden Park

Quarter-finals

Semi-finals

Replay

Final

Teams

See also
1907–08 in Scottish football

References

Scottish Cup seasons
Cup
Scot